WJPI (1470 AM) was an Urban Gospel radio station formerly licensed to Plymouth, North Carolina, United States. The station was owned by 24-7 Communications, LLC.

WJPI went silent on April 1, 2011. On September 28, 2012, the Federal Communications Commission (FCC) cancelled the station's license and deleted the WJPI call sign from its database.

References

External links

Defunct religious radio stations in the United States
JPI
Radio stations disestablished in 2012
Defunct radio stations in the United States
2012 disestablishments in North Carolina
JPI
JPI